Nephridiophaga is a genus of single cell eukaryotes, now considered to be fungi, that pathogenically inhabit the Malpighian tubules of insects. Ivanic described the type species from honey bees.

Morphology and life cycle
Nephridiophaga spores are small, flattened ovals that resemble a red blood cell. Each spore contains a single nucleus and may have an inconspicuous, central opening. Spores are ingested by insects. Once inside the host, spores germinate, though whether in the gut or elsewhere is not known. Plasmodia inhabit and feed on Malpighian tubule cells where they are in direct contact with the cytoplasm. Multi-nucleate plasmodia are eventually released into the lumen, some attach to the brush border of the tubule cells using pseudopodia that interdigitate with the microvilli of the cells. Other plasmodia form merozoite-like cells. Plasmodia released into the lumen form sporoblasts internally with a spore wall enclosing each nucleus. Sporoblasts can be asexual or sexual. Asexual sporoblasts are formed from a type of closed mitosis with chromosomes un-condensed and spindle poles remaining un-connected to the nuclear envelope, which is a common form of mitosis for fungi. Sexual sporoblasts are formed after the fusion of meiotic nuclei; however, the details of meiosis and fusion are not known, and the phenomenon is doubted by some authors. Spores are excreted from the insect in its feces.

Taxonomy
Nephridiophaga was originally placed in the protist order Haplosporidia, though not all researchers agreed, with some placing it in the Microsporidia, and others leaving it unclassified. Molecular phylogenetic studies of species infecting cockroaches have shown that the genus belongs in or close to the Chytrid division of the kingdom Fungi.

Species
Based on
 Nephridiophaga apis Ivanić 1937
 Nephridiophaga archimandrita Radek, Wellmanns & Wolf 2011
 Nephridiophaga blaberi Radek & Storch 2000
 Nephridiophaga blatellae (Crawley 1905) Woolever 1966
 Nephridiophaga forficulae (Léger 1909) Ormières & Manier 1973
 Nephridiophaga lucihormetica Radek, Wellmanns & Wolf 2011
 Nephridiophaga maderae Radek et al. 2017
 Nephridiophaga meloidorum (Purrini & Rohde 1988) Lange 1993
 Nephridiophaga ormieresi Toguebaye et al. 1986
 Nephridiophaga periplanetae (Lutz & Splendore 1903) Lange 1933
 Nephridiophaga schalleri (Pumni & Rohde 1988) Lange 1993
 Nephridiophaga tangae (Purrini, Weiser & Kohring 1988) Lange 1993
 Nephridiophaga xenoboli Ganapati & Narasimhamurti 1960

References

Fungus genera
Fungi